The 2011 FINA Women's Water Polo World League was the tenth edition of the event, organised by the world's governing body in aquatics, the FINA. After playing in groups within the same continent, eight teams qualify to play in a final tournament, called the Super Final in Beijing, China from June 1 to June 6, 2013.

Super Final 
 June, 1 – June 6, 2011, Beijing, China

Seeding

Knockout stage

Semifinals

All times are CST (UTC+8)

Bronze medal match

All times are CST (UTC+8)

Final

All times are CST (UTC+8)

5th–8th Places

Final ranking 

Team roster
Yang Jun, Teng Fei, Liu Ping, Sun Yujun, He Jin, Sun Yating, Song Donglun, Zhu Yajing, Mei Xiaohan, Ma Huanhuan, Zhang Cong, Zhang Lei, Wang Yi. Head coach: Alexander Kleymenov.

References

World League, women
2013
International water polo competitions hosted by China